Callender may refer to:

People
Callender (surname)

Places
Callender, Iowa, United States
An alternative spelling of Callander, Scotland

Companies and establishments
Marie Callender's, restaurant and food manufacturer

See also

 Calendar
 Calender
 Callander (disambiguation)
 Callendar (disambiguation)
 Colander
 Qalandar (disambiguation)